The electric Jaguar XJ was a battery-electric luxury saloon car due to be launched in 2021 by British car company Jaguar Land Rover (JLR) under their Jaguar marque. It was to supersede the XJ (X351), the last example of which was built in July 2019. In February 2021, however, CEO Thierry Bolloré announced that this car was cancelled as part of Jaguar's "Reimagine" plan, although the XJ name may be revived at a later date.

History

Project X391
On 5 July 2019, the last day of production of their XJ (X351) car at their Castle Bromwich site, JLR announced they intended to build its replacement, an all-electric luxury saloon car, at the same plant. JLR had confirmed its plans previously in May. A teaser image of the model was shown at the 2019 Frankfurt Auto Show. The car was originally expected to be launched in 2020. According to The Verge, the new model was being "developed by the same team that created the I-Pace" and JLR were planning to make a "new range" of electrified vehicles at the plant. The project was codenamed X391, and was being developed alongside the Land Rover "Road Rover" (project code L392), which was detailed in October 2019.

JLR had planned to update the Castle Bromwich plant to produce the car on the company's new Modular Longitudinal Architecture (MLA) platform. The plan to build the electric Jaguar XJ saloon, replacing the manufacturing of the conventional XJ at this plant, was viewed as essential for "safeguarding the jobs of 2,500 people" (or 2,700 people, according to BBC News). Manufacturing of the new model had been expected to start in autumn 2019, after a significant investment in upgrades to the facility. David Bailey, a professor of business economics at Birmingham Business School, said that, without the new electric model, the Castle Bromwich plant would "effectively be dead". The COVID-19 pandemic in the United Kingdom forced JLR to halt non-essential spending, delaying the scheduled unveiling of X391 and L392 by two months to October and November 2020.

By January 2021, X391 had failed to launch and speculation on the fate of Castle Bromwich and the upcoming electric XJ began; X391 was cancelled formally in February; Bolloré had made the decision to discontinue development within his first month with JLR: "XJ was a completely different kind of car from the ones we were proposing – different in technology, battery chemistry, electronics, size, performance and market position. It would never have suited our plans." Mardell clarified Bolloré's stance: "The current MLA program ... would have been catch-up in [emissions] compliance and that just isn't good enough in this industry today" and added "[X391] wouldn't have that modern luxury, that future Jaguar vision, that drop-dead aspiration that we need to make this brand work ... So we had to make a tough decision." After the electric XJ was cancelled, JLR announced that it would "end mass production of cars at (Castle Bromwich) before 2025".

In early 2022, JLR announced that under the "Reimagine" plan, the planned all-electric line-up (by 2025) would be based on an internally-developed platform known as Panthera. Bolloré stated that Panthera would not be shared with Land Rover, as it was designed to allow Jaguar to provide "unique proportions" and capabilities, and would help the marque survive as it moved to a higher price point and lower volume. The upcoming Panthera-based flagship of the Jaguar line is anticipated to be called the XJ. Later in February, Jaguar stated it would develop Panthera jointly with Magna Steyr, which assembles the I-Pace under contract to JLR in Austria.

Design
In March 2020, a prototype X391 was photographed while undergoing testing on public roads; although the car's features were obscured, Autocar concluded the prototype's "long bonnet and high waistline aren't unlike those of the outgoing XJ"; according to the same article, X391 would have been wider and taller than X351.

References

External links

Electric concept cars
XJ